Md. Umar Farooq Bangladesh Nationalist Party politician. He was elected a member of parliament from Kurigram-2 in February 1996.

Career 
Umar Farooq He is the Kurigram district BNP advisor. He is the former chairman of Holokhana Union of Kurigram Sadar Upazila. He was elected to parliament from Kurigram-2 as a Bangladesh Nationalist Party candidate in 15 February 1996 Bangladeshi general election.

References 

Living people
Year of birth missing (living people)
People from Kurigram District
Bangladesh Nationalist Party politicians
6th Jatiya Sangsad members